The Comprehensive Peace Accord (abbreviated CPA) was signed on 21 November 2006 between the Government of Nepal and the Communist Party of Nepal (Maoist Centre)—at the time known as the Communist Party of Nepal (Maoist).

Highlights of the peace accord
The peace accord marked the formal end of the Nepalese Civil War that began in 1996.  It included the following provisions:

 The Maoist People's Liberation Army to be placed in temporary cantonments, where they would be rehabilitated and re-integrated into the society, and the monarchist army to be confined within the barracks. Both armies to be monitored and supervised by the United Nations Mission in Nepal, as per the earlier agreement reached between the government and the Maoists. 
 Strict implementation of all previous pacts/agreements reached between the government and Maoists.
 Termination of the military action and the armed mobilization. Both sides to stop attacks or any kind of violent and offensive activities from either side; no new recruitment in armed forces of both sides and no transportation of arms and ammunition and explosives.
 Both sides to assist each other to maintain law, peace, and order
 Both sides to fully commit themselves to uphold all international human rights laws and civil liberties, and the Office of the United Nations High Commissioner for Human Rights to monitor the human rights situation.
 The King to be stripped of political rights and his property to be nationalized under public trusts.
 Scrapping of the Maoists' parallel administration (People's governments, People's Courts) across the country.
 Strong punitive policy to curb corruption and confiscation of property earned illegally through corruption 
 Formation of National Peace and Rehabilitation Commission, Truth Commission, and a high-level Commission for State Restructuring.
 Respectful rehabilitation and social integration of the people displaced during the insurgency

Implementation

CPA's implementation has been a topic of intense debate over the years. The Maoist army has been confined within temporary cantonments that are verified and monitored by the United Nations (UNMIN). Their arms have been locked in the cantonment and guarded by United Nations Mission in Nepal (UNMIN). An equal number of arms of Nepal Army has also been guarded by the UNMIN.
As of 2007, properties confiscated by Maoists had not been fully returned.

There was disagreement between Maoists and other parties on issues of integration of the Maoist army into the Nepal army. Former Prime Minister Madav Kumar Nepal says that the Maoist army will be rehabilitated and integrated into the Nepal Army but key coalition partners of the Nepali Congress and Madhesi Janadhikar Forum are vehemently opposed to the idea. Even the former Defence Minister Bidhya Devi Bhandari is strongly against the deal.

After a second round of verification, 4,008 verified minor and late recruits were released from cantonments beginning in January 2010. Among the released 4,008 ex-combatants from seven main camps and other 21 satellite camps located at various parts of the country, 2,973 were verified minors (who were under 18 when the peace deal was signed on November 21, 2006) and 1,035 were late recruits (recruited after November 21, 2006).  the United Nations was providing four types of rehabilitation packages for released ex-combatants which include vocational training, sponsoring school education, health education training and supporting small business initiatives. Research was done to identify how the private sector could support the rehabilitation program and help in consolidating peace.

On 10 February 2015,  the Truth and Reconciliation Commission was created, with Ganesh Dutta Bhatta as chairperson.

References

External links
Information on the Comprehensive Peace Accord 
Full Text of Nepal Comprehensive Peace Agreement, UN Peacemaker
Text of all peace accords for Nepal, UN Peacemaker

Peace treaties
History of Nepal (1951–2008)
Politics of Nepal
Treaties of Nepal
Treaties concluded in 2006
Treaties entered into force in 2006
2006 in Nepal
Politics of the Nepalese Civil War